Ryan Cloudster may refer to:

Douglas Cloudster,  a 1920s American biplane aircraft
Ryan ST-100 Cloudster, a 1980s American motor glider